Donskoye is a rural locality (a selo) in Zadonsky District of Lipetsk Oblast, Russia. Population:

Geography
Donskoye is located in the center of the Lipetsk Oblast, on the left bank of the Don River at the confluence of it and the Studenetz creek.

History
Founded in 16th century. One of the first owners of the settlement was Nikita Romanovich Zakharyin-Yuriev - a grandfather of Michael I of Russia.

Population

References

Rural localities in Lipetsk Oblast